Rain Forest is a bronze fountain/sculpture by James FitzGerald located on the campus of Western Washington University. Commissioned in 1959 and unveiled in 1960, it was the first work in the Western Washington University Public Sculpture Collection. The sculpture represents the temperate rainforests of the nearby Olympic Peninsula.

References

1959 sculptures
Fountains in Washington (state)
Outdoor sculptures in Washington (state)
Western Washington University
Works by James FitzGerald (artist)